KCDC may refer to:

KCDC (FM)
Cedar City Regional Airport
Korea Centers for Disease Control and Prevention
Kowloon City District Council, the district council for the Kowloon City District in Hong Kong